The men's 10 metre platform was one of four diving events included in the Diving at the 1996 Summer Olympics programme.

The competition was split into three phases:

Preliminary round 1 August — Each diver performed a set number of dives without any limitation on the difficulty degree. The 18 divers with the highest total score advanced to the semi-final.
Semi-final 1 August — Each diver performed four dives with limitation on the difficulty degree. The 12 divers with the highest combined score from the semi-final and preliminary dives advanced to the final.
Final 2 August — Each diver performed five dives, without limitation on the difficulty degree. The final ranking was determined by the combined score from the final and semifinal dives.

Results

References

Sources
 

Men
1996
Men's events at the 1996 Summer Olympics